"I Can't Get Enough" is an English-Spanish song by American record producer Benny Blanco, Puerto Rican record producer Tainy, American singer Selena Gomez and Colombian singer J Balvin. It was released as a single on February 28, 2019. It was sent to radio on March 12, 2019. It was written by Tainy, Blanco, Gomez, Balvin, Cristina Chiluiza, Jhay Cortez and Mike Sabath. Its music video, directed by Jake Schreier, was released on March 12, 2019.

Background
The collaboration was teased on Gomez's Instagram after she posted pictures of her wearing Benny Blanco's merch and what appeared to be the set of a music video. Gomez later revealed the title.

J Balvin told Entertainment Tonight that Gomez sings in English on the track, while he sings in Spanish. Balvin also spoke positively of working with Gomez, calling her "humble" and "amazing". In another interview, Balvin said Tainy invited him to participate on the song and that he thought it would be a "worldwide hit".

Writing and composition
"I Can't Get Enough" was written by Mike Sabath, Cris Chiluiza, Jesús M. Nieves Cortes along with producers Benny Blanco and Tainy as well as performers Selena Gomez and J Balvin. It runs for 2 minutes and 38 seconds. Selena opens the track with humming, while J Balvin follow rapping in Spanish. Sonically, the song has been described as "a chill electronic track" as well as "a sultry electronic-meets-urban fusion" while lyrically is about "a couple's hot and steamy relationship".

Music video

The music video for "I Can't Get Enough" premiered on 12 March 2019 on Benny Blanco's YouTube channel. The video was directed by Jake Schreier. The video featured the four artists dancing on a gigantic bed. Selena Gomez, J Balvin and Tainy are wearing pyjamas. Benny Blanco is dressed in a large teddy bear suit. The video features Gomez walking and dancing, later with Balvin, Tainy and Blanco, then all four dancing together in the last part of the video.

The video gained almost 5 million online views in the first 24 hours of release. As of June 2021, the video has received over 224 million views on YouTube.

The music video also received a nomination at the 2019 MTV Video Music Awards for "Best Latin".

Commercial performance
In the United States, "I Can't Get Enough" debuted at number 93 on Billboard Hot 100, and peaked at number 66 in its third week. It also entered and peaked at number 31 on the Mainstream Top 40.

Additionally, the song debuted at 46 in Australia, later peaking at number 43. It debuted at number 43 in the United Kingdom, falling off the chart the following week. It re-entered the chart and peaked at number 42 in the next week. The song also debuted and peaked at number 41 in Spain.

Credit and personnel
Credits are adapted from Genius.
Benny Blanco – writer, producer, programming, keyboard
Marco Masis – writer, producer, programming, keyboard
Selena Gomez – lead vocals, background vocals, writer
J Balvin – writer, lead vocals, background vocals, featured artist
Mike Sabath – writer
Cris Chiluiza – writer
Jhay Cortez – writer
Serban Ghenea – mix engineer

Charts

Weekly charts

Year-end charts

Certifications

Release history

References

External links
 
 

2019 singles
2019 songs
Benny Blanco songs
J Balvin songs
Moombahton songs
Macaronic songs
Selena Gomez songs
Song recordings produced by Benny Blanco
Song recordings produced by Tainy
Songs written by Benny Blanco
Songs written by J Balvin
Songs written by Mike Sabath
Songs written by Selena Gomez
Songs written by Tainy
Spanglish songs
Tainy songs